46th CAS Awards
February 27, 2010

Theatrical Releases: 
The Hurt Locker

The 46th Cinema Audio Society Awards, which were held on February 27, 2010, honored the outstanding achievements in sound mixing in film and television of 2009.

Winners and nominees

Film
 The Hurt Locker — Ray Beckett and Paul N. J. Ottosson
 Avatar — Tony Johnson, Christopher Boyes, Gary Summers, and Andy Nelson
 District 9 — Ken Saville, Michael Hedges, and Gilbert Lake
 Star Trek — Peter J. Devlin, Paul Massey, Andy Nelson, and Anna Behlmer
 Transformers: Revenge of the Fallen — Peter J. Devlin, Paul Massey, Andy Nelson, and Anna Behlmer

Television

Series
 Mad Men (Episode: "Guy Walks Into an Advertising Agency") 24 (Episode: "10:00 p.m. – 11:00 p.m.")
 Battlestar Gallactica (Episode: "Daybreak", Part 2)
 Desperate Housewives (Episode: "Boom Crunch")
 Glee (Episode: "Wheels")

Miniseries or Television Film
 Grey Gardens
 Endgame
 House (Episode: "Broken")
 Into the Storm
 Taking Chance

References

2009 film awards
2009 television awards
2009 guild awards
Cinema Audio Society Awards
2010 in American cinema